Jeena Sirf Merre Liye is a 2002 Indian Hindi-language romance film starring Tusshar Kapoor and Kareena Kapoor in the lead roles. It is directed by Talat Jani and produced by Vashu Bhagnani. The film is an official Hindi remake of the 2001 Telugu film Manasantha Nuvve which was based on Anmol Ghadi (1946).

Plot 
Jeena Sirf Merre Liye is about childhood friends Karan (Tusshar Kapoor) and Pinky (Puja) (Kareena Kapoor). Pinky and her father come to a hill station every year during Pinky's school break. Pinky looks forward to coming here for one reason: Karan.  They get separated after Puja's father (Vijayendra Ghatge), a tycoon, goes back to the city. Karan gets adopted by a man also from the city. Puja's father sends her to his brother's house out of the country. Time passes and the two live with each other's memories. They try to find each other but are unable to.

She writes out her childhood story to find Karan and comes across Seema (Mallika Sherawat). Seema comes across Karan and believes him to be her boyfriend. She invited Karan to a party. Puja and Karan were introduced to each other. Later, Seema ask Karan to sing on stage. Karan sang the song "Jeena Sirf Merre Liye" that is when Puja realises that he is her childhood love. Meanwhile, the story that Puja wrote became very popular that Seema's boss wanted to make a film out of it. Seema read the story and realises that Karan and Puja were searching for each other. Seema goes to tell Karan. As he's going to find Puja he gets a call from his dad that his sister's wedding has been canceled.

The reason was Puja's father; he didn't approve of Puja and Karan. He gave Karan only two choices, to forget about his love and his sister's wedding will continue or he unites with Puja and his sister will not be accepted and ruin his family reputation. He immediately called Puja and said he's going to meet her. Puja, not knowing all this, have been waiting for this moment to come. When they met, Puja confesses her feelings to him. Karan said that he has been in love with her ever since they met at the party. Puja was hurt and angry at the same time. She ran away crying. Seema ask Puja for the climax of the story but Puja refuses and ask Seema to find someone else to write the climax. Seema sensed something is wrong. She goes and meet Karan's best friend and ask him to reveal any secrets they have been hiding. Seema find out the truth and tell Puja. Puja realises the truth and marries Karan in front of her father. He shoots Karan who survives. In the end they live happily ever after.

Cast 
  Kareena Kapoor as Puja (Pinky)
 Tusshar Kapoor as Karan Malhotra
 Mallika Sherawat as Seema
 Kader Khan as Mahendra Malhotra
 Vijayendra Ghatge as Pooja's father
 Himani Shivpuri as Mrs. Malhotra
 Alok Nath as Mr. Khanna

Soundtrack
The music of the movie was composed by the music director duo Nadeem–Shravan. All songs of the album became a major hit, with tracks like Jeena Sirf mere liye, Allah Allah and Ek baar toh India attaining special popularity.

References

External links
 
 

2002 films
2000s Hindi-language films
Films scored by Nadeem–Shravan
Hindi remakes of Telugu films
Indian romantic drama films
2002 romantic drama films
Films directed by Talat Jani